Folketing elections were held in Denmark on 25 May 1909. Although the Social Democratic Party received the largest share of the vote, the Venstre Reform Party won the most seats. Voter turnout was 71%.

Results

References

Elections in Denmark
Denmark
Folketing election
Denmark